"Got My Heart Set on You" is a song written by Dobie Gray and Bud Reneau, and recorded by American country music artist John Conlee. It was released in May 1986 as the second single from the album Harmony. The song was Conlee's seventh and final number one country hit.  The single went to number one for one week and spent a total of fourteen weeks on the country chart.

Chart performance

Other versions
John Denver was the first to record this song on his 1985 album Dreamland Express.
Mason Dixon also recorded the song in 1986. Their version peaked at number 72 on the Billboard Hot Country Singles chart in 1986.

References

1986 singles
1985 songs
John Denver songs
John Conlee songs
Mason Dixon (band) songs
Columbia Records singles
Songs written by Dobie Gray